VH1 Presents: The Corrs, Live in Dublin is an album of live performances recorded by Irish pop rock band the Corrs in Dublin, Ireland, accompanied by the Irish Film Orchestra. The album features the Corrs performing previously released songs with slight remixex. Album highlights include two duets with Bono of U2 — performing Ryan Adams' "When the Stars Go Blue", and the Lee Hazlewood/Nancy Sinatra song "Summer Wine". The Corrs also performed Jimi Hendrix's "Little Wing", featuring a guitar solo by Ronnie Wood, who later also performed alongside them for the Rolling Stones song "Ruby Tuesday".

Track listing

Charts and certifications

Worldwide sales: 400,000+

References

The Corrs albums
Albums produced by Mitchell Froom
2002 live albums